Massimo Liverani (born 19 September 1961) is an Italian rally driver and co-driver born in Rocca San Casciano. As a driver, he won the FIA Alternative Energies Cup in 2011, 2012, 2013 and 2014. As a co-driver he won the World Championship in 2007 and 2008 with Giuliano Mazzoni.

References

See also
Raymond Durand (driver)
Guido Guerrini (traveler)

1961 births
Living people
People from Rocca San Casciano
FIA E-Rally Regularity Cup drivers
Italian rally drivers
Italian rally co-drivers
Sportspeople from the Province of Forlì-Cesena